The Equatorial Guinea – São Tomé and Príncipe Maritime Boundary Treaty is a 1999 treaty between Equatorial Guinea and São Tomé and Príncipe which delimits the maritime boundary between the two countries.

The treaty was signed in Malabo on 26 June 1999. The boundary  set out by the text of the treaty consists of two separate parts. The first part of the boundary separates Equatorial Guinea's Annobón Island and São Tomé Island. This portion of the boundary consists of four straight-line maritime segments defined by five individual coordinate points. The boundary is an approximate equidistant line between the two islands.

The second part of the defined boundary separates Río Muni (continental Equatorial Guinea) from Príncipe Island. This portion of the boundary is more complex, consisting of 14 straight-line segments defined by 15 individual coordinate points. Like the first part, this portion of the boundary is an approximate equidistant line between the two countries.

The treaty provisionally came into force immediately upon signature. It has not yet been ratified by the countries, in which case it will become "definitively" in force. The full name of the treaty is Treaty Regarding the Delimitation of the Maritime Boundary between the Republic of Equatorial Guinea and the Democratic Republic of São Tomé and Príncipe.

Notes

References
 Anderson, Ewan W. (2003). International Boundaries: A Geopolitical Atlas. Routledge: New York. ;  OCLC 54061586
 Charney, Jonathan I., David A. Colson, Robert W. Smith. (2005). International Maritime Boundaries, 5 vols. Hotei Publishing: Leiden. ; ; ; ; ;  OCLC 23254092

External links
Full text of treaty

1999 in Equatorial Guinea
1999 in São Tomé and Príncipe
Equatorial Guinea–São Tomé and Príncipe border
Treaties concluded in 1999
Boundary treaties
Treaties of Equatorial Guinea
Treaties of São Tomé and Príncipe
United Nations treaties